Lugnano is a village in Tuscany, central Italy, administratively a frazione of the comune of Vicopisano, province of Pisa. At the time of the 2006 parish census its population was 1,104.

Lugnano is about 15 km from Pisa and 5 km from Vicopisano.

References 

Frazioni of the Province of Pisa